

Results

Titles by club

Titles by country

Medals (1977-2022)

See also
Wheelchair basketball
IWBF Champions Cup
Willi Brinkmann Cup
IWBF Challenge Cup
Kitakyushu Champions Cup

References

Wheelchair basketball competitions in Europe
1988 establishments in Europe